Alan Hill (born 29 June 1950) is a former English cricketer and umpire who played for Derbyshire from 1972 to 1986 and for Orange Free State in South Africa in 1976/77.

Hill was born in Buxworth, Derbyshire and began playing for Derbyshire Juniors in 1965. He progressed to the Second XI by 1970 and in 1972 made his first-class debut against Somerset. He was a right-handed batsman, who usually opened for Derbyshire, and an occasional off-break bowler. In first-class cricket, he hit 65 fifties and 18 hundreds, giving him a career average of 30.89. His occasional off-break bowling took only a modest 9 wickets.

Hill is one of only two cricketers to make a century without hitting a boundary, a record that he shares with Paul Hibbert, making 103 in the match for Orange Free State v Griqualand West in 1976-77.

After he retired Hill became an umpire at first-class and List A level, but stopped after only two seasons. He began coaching cricket, working in many schools, and until the end of the 2009 season, was head coach for Newcastle-under-Lyme School.

His brother, Bernard Hill, made several appearances for the Derbyshire Second XI, but never made it to first-class level.

References

External links

Derbyshire cricketers
Free State cricketers
English cricketers
1950 births
Living people
English cricket umpires